Implode may refer to:

Arts
Implode (album), a 1999 album by industrial group Front Line Assembly
String functions#join, implode() is the join string function in PHP

See also 
 Implosion (disambiguation)